Prayers for the Damned  (referred to as Prayers for the Damned, Vol. 1 on its album cover) is the fourth studio album by American rock band Sixx:A.M. It is the first half of the Prayers for the Damned/Blessed double album. It was followed by the second half, Prayers for the Blessed seven months later.

Release
In July 2015, Nikki Sixx announced that they would release two albums in 2016. On March 1, 2016, the band announced that the title of the first of these two albums would be "Prayers for the Damned" and released its lead single, "Rise". The first album was released on April 29, 2016.

Reception

Prayers for the Damned received mixed to positive reviews from critics. On Metacritic, the album holds a score of 71/100 based on 4 reviews, indicating "generally favorable reviews".

Track listing

Credits

Nikki Sixx – bass guitar, composer, backing vocals
DJ Ashba – lead guitar, composer, backing vocals
James Michael – lead vocals, keyboards, composer
 Dustin Steinke – drums
 Melissa Harding – backing vocals
 Amber Vanbuskirk – backing vocals
 Dave Donnelly – mastering
 Joel Ferber – assistant engineer, music editor

Charts

References

2016 albums
Eleven Seven Label Group albums
Sixx:A.M. albums